Janno Reiljan (8 October 1951 in Mikita – 23 January 2018) was an Estonian politician, economist and professor of foreign economics at the University of Tartu. He has been a member of IX and X Riigikogu. He was a member of Conservative People's Party of Estonia.

He graduated cum laude in 1975 from Tartu State University (now, University of Tartu), Faculty of Economics in econometrics. In 1980, he defended his doctoral dissertation "Problems of using mathematical-statistical methods in the analysis of companies' economic activities" at Moscow State University.

On 23 January 2018, Reiljan died, aged 66, after an accidental fall from six meters from a spiral staircase, breaking four cervical vertebrae. He was interred at Vana-Jaani cemetery (part of Raadi cemetery) in Tartu. His younger brother is politician Villu Reiljan.

References

1951 births
2018 deaths
20th-century Estonian economists
21st-century Estonian economists
Conservative People's Party of Estonia politicians
Members of the Riigikogu, 1999–2003
Members of the Riigikogu, 2003–2007
University of Tartu alumni
Academic staff of the University of Tartu
Recipients of the Order of the White Star, 4th Class
People from Rõuge Parish
Accidental deaths from falls
Accidental deaths in Estonia
Burials at Raadi cemetery
Members of the Riigikogu, 2007–2011